Shanhua may refer to the following places:
Shanhua, Tainan, district in Taiwan
Shanhua Temple, Buddhist temple in Shanxi Province, China